Wyoming School District may refer to:
 Wyoming City Schools (Ohio)
 Wyoming Public Schools (Michigan)